This Boot Is Made for Fonk-N is the fourth album by the American funk band Bootsy's Rubber Band. It was released through Warner Bros. Records on June 1, 1979. Unlike previous albums by Bootsy's Rubber Band, this album did not generate any hit singles. The album was more experimental in nature than previous efforts. It would also mark the last time that the name "Bootsy's Rubber Band" would be used on a Bootsy Collins related project until the 1982 12" single release "Body Slam". This Boot Is Made For Fonk-N peaked at number 9 on the Billboard Top R&B/Hip-Hop Albums chart and number 52 on the Billboard 200 album chart.

The album's cover was drawn by P-Funk album artist Overton Loyd and included an 8-page comic book entitled "The Almost Finished Comic" also drawn by Loyd.

The album was produced by George Clinton and Bootsy Collins under the aliases Dr. Funkenstein and  Starr-Mon. The album was reissued first in 1990 by the Warner/Pioneer company in Japan and then by Warner Music-Europe. In 2007, the album was licensed through Rhino Records and reissued through the Collectors Choice music service.

Track listing
"Under The Influence of a Groove" (Bootsy Collins, George Clinton, Bernie Worrell) - (8:37)
"Bootsy (Get Live)" (Bootsy Collins, George Clinton, Maceo Parker) - (6:18)
"Oh Boy Gorl" (Bootsy Collins, George Clinton, Gary Cooper, Ron Dunbar) - (7:49)
"Jam Fan (Hot)" (Bootsy Collins, George Clinton, Phelps Collins) - (9:05)
"Chug-A-Lug (The Bun Patrol)" (Bootsy Collins, George Clinton, Robert Johnson, Phelps Collins) - (6:29)
"Shejam (Almost Bootsy Show)" (Bootsy Collins, George Clinton, Ron Dunbar) - (5:05)
"Reprise (Get Live)" (Bootsy Collins, George Clinton, Maceo Parker) - (0:40)

Personnel
Bootsy Collins - bass, guitars, drums, percussion
Phelps Collins, Garry Shider, Michael Hampton - guitars
Joel "Razor Sharp" Johnson, Bernie Worrell - keyboards
Gary Cooper - drums, percussion, vocals
Frank Waddy - drums
Carl Small, Larry Fratangelo - percussion
Fred Wesley, Maceo Parker, Richard Griffith, Rick Gardner - horns 
Robert Johnson, Greg Thomas, Chris Williams - vocals
Hal Hansford - engineer

Singles

Three singles were released from the album:

 "Jam Fan (Hot)"/"Shejam (Almost Bootsy Show)" (Warner Bros. WBS 8818)
 "Bootsy (Get Live)"/"Pt. 2" (Warner Bros. WBS 49013)
 "Under The Influence Of A Groove"/"Disco" (Warner Bros. WBS 49073)

The single "Bootsy (Get Live)"/"Pt. 2" features almost two minutes of music that was not included on the album version and has never been released on CD. The B-side of "Jam Fan (Hot)", "Shejam (Almost Bootsy Show)", featured an instrumental version of the song that also was not on the album and has not been issued on CD.

References

Bootsy Collins albums
1979 albums
Warner Records albums